Daniel Robert Buenning (born October 26, 1981) is a former American football guard. He was drafted by the Tampa Bay Buccaneers in the fourth round of the 2005 NFL Draft, and also played professionally for the Chicago Bears and Florida Tuskers. He played college football at Wisconsin.

College career
Buenning played on both sides of the ball at Bay Port High School, earning all-state honors and committing to the University of Wisconsin. He was also a state champion wrestler at Bay Port.

Playing at Wisconsin, Buenning was a four-year starter on the offensive line, and was a team captain his senior season. He was an All-American and All-Big Ten selection after the 2004 season.

Professional career

Tampa Bay Buccaneers
Buenning was drafted by the Tampa Bay Buccaneers in the fourth round (107th overall) of the 2005 NFL Draft, and became an immediate starter. He played in nine games his sophomore season before suffering an anterior cruciate ligament tear against the Dallas Cowboys on Thanksgiving, sidelining him for the rest of 2006 and all of 2007. After spending his first three NFL seasons at guard, he moved to center between the 2007 and 2008 seasons.

Chicago Bears
On September 2, 2008, Buenning was traded to the Chicago Bears for a conditional 2009 sixth-round pick.

On September 4, 2009, the Bears informed Buenning that the team intended to cut him.

Florida Tuskers
In 2009, Buenning played for the Florida Tuskers of the United Football League.

Personal life
Buenning is married. After his football career ended, Buenning became a car salesman in Waupaca, Wisconsin.

References

External links
Chicago Bears bio
Tampa Bay Buccaneers bio
United Football League bio

1981 births
Living people
Sportspeople from Green Bay, Wisconsin
Players of American football from Wisconsin
American football offensive guards
American football centers
Wisconsin Badgers football players
Tampa Bay Buccaneers players
Chicago Bears players
Florida Tuskers players